Sir Jacob Behrens (13 November 1806 – 22 April 1889) was an Anglo–German textile merchant. His company, Sir Jacob Behrens & Son Ltd., was established in 1834 and still operates today. Behrens was Jewish and was a prominent member of the Anglo-Jewish Association.

Biography

Early life
Born in Bad Pyrmont, Germany, into a family of merchants, Sir Jacob Behrens settled in Leeds in 1834, establishing his business there. He then moved to Bradford in 1838, opening a factory in Thornton Road.

The businessman
Behrens helped to establish the Bradford chamber of commerce. Behrens was knighted by Queen Victoria in 1882 for his work in strengthening trade relations between Britain and France.

The educator
Behrens helped to reorganise Bradford Grammar School in 1871, and he helped establish the Great Horton Road Technical College in 1882.

The philanthropist
Behrens was a prominent member of the Bradford Philosophical Society, and founded the Eye and Ear Hospital in Bradford.

References

1806 births
1889 deaths
People from Bad Pyrmont
19th-century German Jews
19th-century British Jews
Knights Bachelor
Businesspeople awarded knighthoods
Burials in West Yorkshire
19th-century British businesspeople